Bancroft Gherardi (November 10, 1832 – December 10, 1903) was a rear admiral of the United States Navy, who served during the Mexican–American War and the American Civil War. Even though his family hailed from French Corsica, because of his Italian surname (typical of Corsicans) he had the distinction of being the first Italian-American admiral in the United States Navy.

Biography

Gherardi was born in Jackson, Louisiana, the son of Donato Gherardi (c. 1800 – 1851), a political refugee from Corsica, and Jane Putnam Bancroft (1798–1843), sister of renowned historian George Bancroft. He was appointed Acting Midshipman June 26, 1846 and served on the  during the Mexican–American War. He entered the U.S. Naval Academy in 1851 and graduated the next year.

He served as President of the Naval Examining Board, as Governor of the Philadelphia Naval Asylum, and as Commandant of the New York Navy Yard. He was promoted to rear admiral on August 25, 1887. In 1893 he was made Commander-in-Chief of the Naval Review Fleet on the Hudson River and then commandant of the New York Navy Yard. 

He retired from the Navy on November 10, 1894, and died at his home in Stratford, Connecticut on December 10, 1903. He is buried with his wife at the United States Naval Academy Cemetery.

Family
Electrical engineer Bancroft Gherardi, Jr. was his son; Assemblyman Gherardi Davis (1858–1941) was his nephew.

Legacy
The destroyer , launched in 1942, was named in his honor.

References

External links
 navsource.org: USS Gherardi

1832 births
1903 deaths
United States Naval Academy alumni
American military personnel of the Mexican–American War
Members of the Aztec Club of 1847
United States Navy rear admirals
People of Connecticut in the American Civil War
Union Navy officers
Military personnel from Connecticut
American people of Corsican descent
People from Jackson, Louisiana
Burials at the United States Naval Academy Cemetery
Military personnel from Louisiana